Pornorama  is a 2007 German comedy film directed by Marc Rothemund.  The film describes the porn industry in Munich between the 60s and the 80s.

Plot

Cast 
 Tom Schilling as Bennie Köpke
 Benno Fürmann as Freddie Köpke
 Karoline Herfurth as Luzie
 Valentina Lodovini as Gina Ferrari
 Michael Gwisdek as Filmvorführer
 Elke Winkens as Frau Schröder
 Leonie Brill as Emmelie
  Dieter Landuris as Césare 
 Lisa Maria Potthoff as Irene 
 Michael Schönborn as Hauptkommissar Wiesner
  Martin Glade as Lothar

References

External links

2007 films
German comedy films
Films about pornography
Films set in Munich
Films set in the 1970s
2007 comedy films
Films directed by Marc Rothemund
2000s German films
2000s German-language films